James Gordon McIntyre, Lord Sorn,  (1896–1983) was a Scottish law lord who served as a Senator of the College of Justice. He was also a decorated war hero from the First World War. He was generally known by his middle name, Gordon.

Life

He was born in Glasgow on 21 July 1896, the son of Thomas McIntyre and Jeanie Paterson. He had three sisters. His father purchased Sorn Castle in 1908 and began remodelling it in 1909. His father owned a shipping line and was Chairman of Lloyds Register but abandoned many of his business activities to concentrate on the estate. Gordon, as he was generally known, was educated at Winchester School.

In the First World War he joined at the outset (aged 18), serving in the Ayrshire Yeomanry. He undertook a short period of officer training then joined the Gallipoli campaign. There he was badly injured in the shoulder in a trench and was rescued by his sergeant. Following recovery, he went to the trenches of the Somme. Here won the Military Cross for capturing a machine gun post. He later won a bar to the medal and also was awarded the Croix de Guerre. He later lost a leg in a grenade attack.

After the war he went to Balliol College, Oxford where he gained a BA in 1921. He then studied law at Glasgow University graduating LLB in 1923. Passing the Scottish Bar he became an advocate and became King's Counsel (KC) in 1936. From 1939 to 1944 he was dean of the Faculty of Advocates.

On the death of his father in 1920 he inherited Sorn Castle.

In November 1944 he was elected a Senator of the College of Justice with the title Lord Sorn, to replace Thomas Graham Robertson, Lord Robertson.

He retired in 1963 and died on 1 July 1983. He is buried with his father in Sorn churchyard.

Family

In 1923 he married Madeline Scott Moncrieff.

They had two children: Robert Gordon McIntyre and Olivia McIntyre.

References

1896 births
1983 deaths
Lawyers from Glasgow
People educated at Winchester College
Recipients of the Military Cross
Recipients of the Croix de Guerre (France)
Alumni of the University of Oxford
Alumni of the University of Glasgow
Deans of the Faculty of Advocates
Senators of the College of Justice
Scottish amputees
Ayrshire (Earl of Carrick's Own) Yeomanry officers